12 is a 2007 legal drama film by Russian director, screenwriter, producer and actor Nikita Mikhalkov. The film is a Russian-language remake of Sidney Lumet's 1957 film 12 Angry Men, which in turn was based on Reginald Rose's 1955 stage play, Twelve Angry Men, itself based on Rose's 1954 teleplay of the latter's same name.

Mikhalkov was awarded the Special Lion at the 64th Venice International Film Festival for his work on the film, which also received an Academy Award nomination for Best Foreign Language Film. It received generally positive reviews from critics.

Plot
A 12-men jury decides whether a young Chechen boy is guilty of the murder of his stepfather, a Russian military officer. Initially it seems that the boy was the murderer. However, one of the juror votes in favour of acquittal. Since the verdict must be rendered unanimously, the jurors review the case, and one by one come to the conclusion that the boy was framed. The murder was performed by criminals involved in the construction business. The discussion is repeatedly interrupted by flashbacks from the boy's wartime childhood.

In the end the foreman states that he was sure the boy did not commit the crime but he will not vote in favour of acquittal since the acquitted boy will be subsequently killed by the same criminals. In addition, the foreman reveals that he is a former intelligence officer. After a brief argument, the foreman agrees to join the majority. Later the foreman tells the boy that he will find the real murderers.

Cast
 Sergei Makovetsky – 1st Juror
 Nikita Mikhalkov – 2nd Juror
 Sergei Garmash – 3rd Juror
 Valentin Gaft – 4th Juror
 Alexei Petrenko – 5th Juror
 Yuri Stoyanov – 6th Juror
 Sergei Gazarov – 7th Juror
 Mikhail Yefremov – 8th Juror
 Alexey Gorbunov – 9th Juror
 Sergei Artsibashev – 10th Juror
 Viktor Verzhbitsky – 11th Juror
 Roman Madyanov – 12th Juror
 Alexander Adabashyan – Bailiff
 Apti Magamayev – Chechen boy
 Abdi Magamayev – Chechen adult
Ferit Myazitov – Mikhail Gorbachev

Reception
The movie received generally positive critical opinion in Russia and abroad. 12 has an approval rating of 77% on review aggregator website Rotten Tomatoes, based on 60 reviews, and an average rating of 6.88/10. The website's critical consensus states, "Loosely based on 1957's 12 Angry Men, Nikita Mikhalkov's superbly acted 12 is clever and gripping like its predecessor, but with a distinctly Russian feel". It also has a score of 72 out of 100 on Metacritic, based on 17 critics, indicating "generally favorable reviews".

Russian president Vladimir Putin together with the film crew, Chechnya's president Ramzan Kadyrov and Ingushetia's president Murat Zyazikov watched the film in Putin's residence in Novo-Ogarevo; after the screening Putin remarked that the film "brought a tear to the eye". Opposition journalist Zoya Svetova labeled the film as pro-Putin, assuming that some of the characters are caricatures of Russian opposition politicians Valeriya Novodvorskaya and Mikhail Khodorkovsky as well as producer Dmitry Lesnevsky.

Awards
12 received a special Golden Lion for the "consistent brilliance" of its work and was praised by many critics at the 64th Venice International Film Festival. The Venice jury defined the movie as "confirmation of his [Mikhalkov's] mastery in exploring and revealing to us, with great humanity and emotion, the complexity of existence". It was nominated for an Academy Award for Best Foreign Language Film.

References

External links
 
 
 
 
 TriTe – Mikhalkov Productions
 The eXile- Revisiting 12: Mikhalkov's "Oscar-Worthy" Remake – By Yasha Levine

2007 films
2000s legal films
Russian crime thriller films
2000s Russian-language films
Chechen-language films
2000s legal drama films
Courtroom films
Cultural depictions of Mikhail Gorbachev
Films directed by Nikita Mikhalkov
Films scored by Eduard Artemyev
Films set in Russia
Films shot in Krasnodar Krai
Films shot in the North Caucasus
Metro-Goldwyn-Mayer films
Sony Pictures Classics films
Juries in fiction
Remakes of American films
Twelve
Films produced by Nikita Mikhalkov
Films with screenplays by Nikita Mikhalkov